The Narrow Gauge Railway Museum (Welsh: Amgueddfa Rheilffyrdd Bach Cul) is a purpose-built museum dedicated to narrow-gauge railways situated at the  station of the Talyllyn Railway in Tywyn, Gwynedd, Wales.

The museum has a collection of more than 1,000 items from over eighty narrow-gauge railways in Wales, England, the Isle of Man, Ireland and Scotland. This includes six locomotives on display (and several others in store or at other sites); eleven wagons inside with a further eleven outside; a display showing the development of track work from early plateways to modern narrow-gauge tracks; several large signals along with single line working apparatus and documents; a growing collection of tickets and other documents, posters, notices, crockery and souvenirs; relics from vehicles scrapped long ago and the Awdry Study, re-created with the original furniture and fittings in memory of the Rev. Wilbert Awdry, an early volunteer on the Talyllyn Railway best known for his series of railway books such as "Thomas the Tank Engine."

Background

The Narrow Gauge Railway Museum collection began in the 1950s when the Talyllyn Railway Preservation Society (TRPS) was the first voluntary society in the world to take over and run a public passenger carrying railway. Narrow-gauge railways were becoming redundant and their equipment scrapped. Immediately, items from other narrow-gauge lines began to be offered to the TRPS and a committee was formed to acquire examples of locomotives, rolling stock and other equipment to place on public display. In 1964 a charitable trust was formed to manage and develop the museum and this was replaced by the present Narrow Gauge Railway Museum Trust on 11 July 1994.

The main activity of the trust takes place at the Talyllyn Railway Wharf station. Inside the museum interactive and static exhibits illustrate the diversity, individuality, technical ingenuity and charm of narrow-gauge railways. The fleet of historic wagons kept outside is operational and the original wagon weighbridge from 1865 has been restored and included in a redeveloped section of the Wharf yard including a purpose-built weighbridge hut.

The first museum displays were in the old Gunpowder Store at Wharf station. Soon a walled yard, used for the storage of coal, was roofed over and an extension added in 1964. The building served well but had no insulation, was damp and cold in winter and hot and airless in summer making it difficult to conserve the collection. What was needed was a new museum building with adequate space, accessibility and environment, and professionally designed displays.

At the same time the Talyllyn Railway was seeking to improve its facilities at Wharf station to better meet the needs of passengers and the operation of the railway. When the TRPS took over, there was a single small building which served as a booking office, weigh house, and general office for the railway. Like the museum, this had been augmented by various extensions and portable buildings: a radical solution was needed. With the approach of the golden jubilee of the TRPS in 2000, an appeal was launched for funds to build a new station and museum. Funding from the Heritage Lottery Fund to conserve the unique museum collection plus other government and charitable sources was obtained to match money raised by friends of the Railway and Museum. A two-storey building now houses the museum, refreshment room, education room and railway offices, which links with a shop and booking office in an extended version of the original building. Work began in stages in 2001, and the new station and museum complex was opened by Charles, Prince of Wales and Camilla, Duchess of Cornwall on 13 July 2005. In 2010 the museum gained Accredited status under the Museums, Libraries and Archives Council scheme to improve standards in museums.

Locomotives at the museum

Rolling stock on display in the museum 

 Birkby's Brickworks, small steel wagon with 4 flangeless wheels and forked bracket to accept haulage chain. It ran on an 18in gauge plateway made up from lengths of steel angle. Donated in 1983.
 Bicslade Tramroad oak-framed 4-wheel plateway wagon, from Bixslade in the Forest of Dean. The oldest item in the collection built about 1790 and given to the Trust in 1964.
 Dinorwic Quarry Railway (Padarn Railway),  gauge host wagon built 1848 to carry three 2′ gauge slate wagons and a 2′ gauge guards van from the Quarries to the Incline down to Port Dinorwic. The line was closed in 1961 and the wagons came to the museum in 1964.
 Nantlle Tramway wagon, gauge ; steel: double-flanged wheels, loose on fixed axles, built by Glaslyn Foundry, Portmadoc. Line opened 1828 worked by horses until the final section was closed by British Railways (BR) in 1963, the last use of horses by BR. Given to the museum in 1958.
 Oakley Quarry Coal Wagon,  wooden body with doors at one end, ran on Festiniog Railway. Purchased in 1963.
 Bryn Eglwys Quarry Wagon, wood, for carrying slate slabs out of the quarry. Donated in 1980 and in store until restoration and display in 2001.
 Woolwich Arsenal Wagon,  wooden flat body for carrying explosives. Donated in 1976.

Rolling stock on display outside the museum 

 Corris Railway Mail Wagon, used for carrying mail by gravity down the line every week-day afternoon, lamp bracket fitted at down end. Four-wheel, end door, 1-ton wagon ex-GWR 31992, TR 10, Turner axleboxes, bought by TR in 1951 and donated to museum in 1994.
 Corris Railway. Incline balancing wagon used on incline at Aberlefenni. Given to museum in 2006.
 Crofty Tin Mine,  14 cu ft capacity tipping mine tub to museum in 1996.
 Great Western Railway steel bodied,  slate wagon for use in Blaenau Ffestiniog area: purchased 1980.
 London & North Western Railway,  steel slate wagon, built at Earlstown in 1887, LMS 284465, used in Blaenau Ffestiniog area on piggy back wagons to carry slate for transshipment. Donated by British Railways in 1964.
 Talyllyn Railway,  rebuilt wagons, using original and replica steel and cast iron parts and new timber. (The numbers are simply for identification and do not relate to historic numbers)
 101 – two bar wooden slate wagon, 1 ton capacity: the first item in the museum collection in 1953.
 117 – metal bodied incline wagon: to museum in 1973.
 136 – three bar wooden slate wagon, 1 ton capacity: to museum in 1994.
 146 – covered wooden van, with brake, based on parts lying at Rhydyronen from the 1930s to 1997.
 164 –  two bar wooden slate wagon, 1 ton capacity with brakes: purchased 2000.
 178 – display wagon at Neptune Road entrance.

Locomotives at other sites

Rolling stock on display at other sites 
 Furzebrook Wagon –  gauge wagon with wooden body with end door and sledge brake, four wheels, from the Pike Bros, Fayle & Co clay workings in the Isle of Purbeck, donated by The Narrow Gauge Railway Society 1958 was loaned for display at the Swanage Railway in 2002.

Major exhibits in the museum 

 Track, from early plateways to modern versions
 Narrow-gauge railways in industry
 Narrow-gauge railways in military use
 Narrow-gauge railways as public carriers
 Temporary exhibitions
 Ticket collection
 Rev. W. Awdry collection
 New accessions
 Signals from the Manx Northern Railway, the Isle of Man Railway and County Donegal Railways
 Chattenden and Upnor Railway lever and locking frame to control points and signals in replica signal box
 Chattenden and Upnor Railway signal
 Film of Talyllyn Railway in the 1950s

Major exhibits at other locations 
 DeWinton cast iron lamp post in Wharf yard
 Festiniog disc signal in Wharf yard
 TR wagon turntable and track: Wharf edge
 TR wagon weigh bridge with original TR trackwork and new weigh bridge office (built 2008 - 2011)
 Point (turnout) in 1865 track materials: Abergynolwyn
 Village Incline winding drum and site: Abergynolwyn

See also
 List of British railway museums
 British narrow-gauge railways

References

External links

 Narrow Gauge Railway Museum
 Talyllyn Railway

Tywyn
Railway museums in Gwynedd
Talyllyn Railway
1959 establishments in Wales
Museums established in 1959
Narrow-gauge railway museums in the United Kingdom